is a mixed-use redevelopment project in Fukushima-ku ward of Osaka City, Japan, located on the former site of Osaka University Hospital.

Facilities 
Headquarters of Asahi Broadcasting Corporation
ABC Hall
Dōjima River Forum (hall)
The Tower Osaka (residential)
River Residence Dōjima (residential)
Keio University satellite campus
Osaka University of Arts satellite campus
Dōjima Crosswalk (shops, restaurants)
Gold's Gym

Neighbouring public facilities 
Osaka Nakanoshima Combined Government Office Building
National Museum of Art, Osaka
Osaka Science Museum
Osaka International Convention Center

Transport links 
Keihan Electric Railway Nakanoshima Line Nakanoshima Station (3-5 mins walk)
Hanshin Electric Railway Main Line Fukushima Station (5-10 mins walk)
JR Tōzai Line Shin-Fukushima Station (5-10 mins walk)

Buildings and structures in Osaka
Residential skyscrapers in Japan